Peter "The Choirboy" Culshaw (born 15 March 1973 in Liverpool) is Professional boxer, who was former Commonwealth Flyweight Champion and British title challenger. an English amateur light flyweight and professional fly/super fly/bantam/super bantam/featherweight boxer of the 1990s and 2000s, As an amateur he became the youngest senior champion in ABA history when he claimed the flyweight crown in 1990 at the age of 17, you now have to be over 18 to enter, Winning the Amateur Boxing Association of England (ABAE) light flyweight (48 kg) title, against Allan Mooney (Sydney Street ABC), boxing out of Huyton ABC, and as a professional won the British Boxing Board of Control (BBBofC) Central Area flyweight title, World Boxing Union (WBU) International Super Flyweight Title, World Boxing Union (WBU) flyweight title, World Boxing Federation (WBF) super flyweight title, and Commonwealth flyweight title, his professional fighting weight varied from , i.e. flyweight to , i.e. featherweight.

References

External links

1973 births
Bantamweight boxers
English male boxers
Featherweight boxers
Flyweight boxers
Light-flyweight boxers
Living people
Boxers from Liverpool
Super-bantamweight boxers
Super-flyweight boxers